Spain competed at the 1986 European Athletics Championships in Stuttgart, then West Germany, from 26–31 August 1986.

For the first time, a female athlete from Spain won a medal at the European Athletics Championships.

Medals

Results

Men
Track & road events

Field events

Women
Track & road events

Nations at the 1986 European Athletics Championships
1986
European Athletics Championships